Sharam-Sharam da Conceição Diniz, known professionally as Sharam Diniz, is an Angolan-Portuguese fashion model and businesswoman. She is known for her appearances in the Victoria's Secret Fashion Show.

Career
Diniz has been on the cover of GQ Portugal and Vogue Portugal. Her first modeling job was a 2011 Victoria's Secret spring advertisement. She appeared in a SoHo billboard for 7 for All Mankind jeans.

Diniz has walked the runway for Balmain, Calvin Klein, Prabal Gurung, Vivienne Westwood, Cushnie et Ochs, Rag & Bone, Kenneth Cole, Carolina Herrera, Hervé Léger, Jason Wu among others. She has starred in ads for Tom Ford, Chanel, Ralph Lauren, Armani Exchange, 7 For All Mankind, Target, H&M, Clinique and Anne Klein.

She has appeared in Allure, Cosmopolitan, V (magazine) and Sports Illustrated Swimsuit Issue among others.

In Portugal, she was given the Globos de Ouro ("Golden Globe") award for "Best Female Model".

Diniz appeared in a “Made in Portugal” ad.

See also 
List of Victoria's Secret models

References 

1991 births
Living people
People from Luanda
Angolan female models
Portuguese female models
Angolan emigrants to Portugal
Golden Globes (Portugal) winners